Cephaloscymnus zimmermanni is a species of lady beetle in the family Coccinellidae. It is found in North America.

Subspecies
These two subspecies belong to the species Cephaloscymnus zimmermanni:
 Cephaloscymnus zimmermanni australis Gordon, 1970
 Cephaloscymnus zimmermanni zimmermanni Crotch, 1873

References

Further reading

 

Coccinellidae
Articles created by Qbugbot
Beetles described in 1873